Maitrī (Sanskrit; Pali: mettā) means benevolence,  loving-kindness, friendliness, amity, good will, and active interest in others.  It is the first of the four sublime states (Brahmaviharas) and one of the ten pāramīs of the Theravāda school of Buddhism.

The cultivation of benevolence (mettā bhāvanā) is a popular form of Buddhist meditation. It is a part of the four immeasurables in Brahmavihara (divine abidings) meditation. Metta as 'compassion meditation' is often practiced in Asia by broadcast chanting, wherein monks chant for the laity.

The compassion and universal loving-kindness concept of Metta is discussed in the Metta Sutta of Buddhism, and is also found in the ancient and medieval texts of Hinduism and Jainism as Metta or Maitri.

Small sample studies on the potential of loving-kindness meditation approach on patients suggest potential benefits. However, peer reviews question the quality and sample size of these studies.

Etymology and meaning
Mettā is a Pali word, from maitrī itself derived from mitra which, states Monier-Williams, means "friendly, amicable, benevolent, affectionate, kind, good-will", as well as a form of "love, amity, sympathy". The term is found in this sense in the Vedic literature, such as the Shatapatha Brahmana and various early Upanishads, and Vedanga literature such as Pāṇini's Aṣṭādhyāyī 5.4.36. The term appears in Buddhist texts as an important concept and practice.

Buswell and Lopez, as well as Harvey, translate metta as "loving-kindness". In Buddhist belief, this is a Brahma-vihara (divine abode) or an immeasurable that leads to a meditative state by being a counter to ill-will. It removes clinging to negative state of mind, by cultivating kindness unto all beings.

The "far enemy" of Metta is hate or ill-will, a mind-state in obvious opposition. The "near enemy" (quality which superficially resembles Metta but is in fact more subtly in opposition to it), is (attachment) greed: here too one likes experiencing a virtue, but for the wrong reason.

Mettā meditation 
Mettā meditation, or often loving-kindness meditation, is the practice concerned with the cultivation of Mettā, i.e. benevolence, kindness, and amity. The practice generally consists of silent repetitions of phrases such as "may you be happy" or "may you be free from suffering", for example directed at a person who, depending on tradition, may or may not be internally visualized.

Two different methodological approaches have been discerned in recent review papers, practices that focus on compassion and practices focussing on loving-kindness. Focusing on compassion means that meditation consists of the wish to relieve a being from suffering, whereas focussing on loving-kindness means wishing a being happiness.

The practice gradually increases in difficulty with respect to the targets that receive the practitioner’s compassion or loving-kindness. At first the practitioner is targeting "oneself, then loved ones, neutral ones, difficult ones and finally all beings, with variations across traditions".

A 2015 meta-analysis synthesising various high quality experiments on loving-kindness meditation, found a medium-sized improvement to daily positive emotion, with meditation on the loving-kindness aspect of metta having a greater effect than practices with a focus on compassion. The length of time meditating did not affect the magnitude of positive impact of the practice.

Origins
Prior to the advent of the Buddha, according to Martin Wiltshire, there existed the traditions of Brahma-loka and meditation with the four virtues of loving-kindness, compassion, empathetic joy and equanimity. The early Buddhist texts assert that pre-Buddha ancient Indian sages who taught these virtues were earlier incarnations of the Buddha. Post-Buddha, these same virtues are found in the Hindu texts such as verse 1.33 of the Yoga Sutras of Patañjali, wherein the word Maitri is synonymous with Metta.

Loving-kindness (maitri), along with compassion and equanimity, are found in the early Upanishads of Hinduism, while loving-kindness (metta) is found in early Sutras of Jainism along with compassion, empathetic joy and equanimity. The ancient Indian Paccekabuddhas mentioned in the early Buddhist Suttas, those who lived before the Buddha, mention all "four immeasurables" and Brahmavihara, and they are claimed in the Suttas to be previous incarnations of the Buddha.

According to Peter Harvey, the Buddhist scriptures acknowledge that the Metta-concept containing four Brahmavihara meditation practices "did not originate within the Buddhist tradition". The Buddha never claimed that the "four immeasurables" and related Metta-meditation were his unique ideas, states Harvey Aronson, in a manner similar to "cessation, quieting, nirvana".

The pre-Buddha Chandogya Upanishad, states Jayatilleke, in section 8.15 teaches metta and ahimsa (doctrine of non-harm, esp. non-violence) to all creatures claiming that this practice leads to Brahmaloka. The shift in Vedic ideas, from rituals to virtues, is particularly discernible in the early Upanishadic thought, and it is unclear as to what extent and how early Upanishadic traditions of Hinduism and Sramanic traditions such as Buddhism and Jainism influenced each other, on ideas such as "four immeasurables", meditation and Brahmavihara.

In the Jain text, the Tattvartha Sutra (Chapter 7, sutra 11), which is accepted by all Jainism sub-traditions as authoritative, there is a mention of four right sentiments: Maitri, pramoda, karunya, madhyastha:

Buddhist texts

In the Pāli Canon, the term metta appears in many texts such as the Kakacupama Sutta and Karaniya Metta Sutta.  Other canonical materials, such as in the Paṭisambhidāmagga, elaborate on it as a practice.  And yet other canonical sources, such as the Abhidhamma, underline the key role of benevolence in the development of wholesome karma for better rebirths.

This basic statement of intention and verse can also be found in several other canonical discourses.

Karaniya Metta Sutta (Sn 1.8)

Metta or lovingkindness here, states Harvey, is a heartfelt aspiration for the happiness of all beings. It is different than "lack of ill-will", and more an antidote to fear and hatred. It is the precept to conquer anger by kindness, conquer the liar by truth, conquer stingy by giving, conquer evil by good, states Harvey.

Vatthūpama Sutta
In over a dozen discourses, the following description (in English and Pāli) is provided for radiating loving-kindness in six directions:

In the canon, this basic formula is expanded upon in a variety of ways.  For instance, a couple of discourses provide the following description to gain rebirth in the heavenly realm of Brahmā ( sahavyatāya maggo) :
"What ... is the path to the company of Brahmā? Here a bhikkhu abides pervading one quarter with a mind imbued with benevolence, likewise the second, likewise the third, likewise the fourth; so above, below, around, and everywhere, and to all as to himself, he abides pervading the all-encompassing world with a mind imbued with benevolence, abundant, exalted, immeasurable, without hostility, and without ill will. When the deliverance of mind by benevolence is developed in this way, no limiting action remains there, none persists there.
"Just as a vigorous trumpeter could make himself (or herself) heard without difficulty in the four quarters, so too, when the deliverance of mind by benevolence is developed in this way, no limiting action remains there, none persists there.  This is the path to the company of Brahmā."

Patisambhidamagga Mettakatha (Ps. 2.4)

In the Khuddaka Nikāya's , traditionally ascribed to Sariputta, is a section entitled Mettākathā (Ps. 2.4, "Story on Loving-Kindness"). In this instruction, a general formula (below, in English and Pāli), essentially identical to the aforementioned Cunda Kammaraputta Sutta verse (especially evident in the Pāli), is provided for radiating benevolence:

In addition, this instruction categorizes twenty-two ways in which "the mind-deliverance of benevolence" (mettācetovimutti) can be radiated with
 five ways of "unspecified pervasion" - all beings (sabbe sattā ), all breathing things, all creatures (sabbe bhūtā bhāvapariyāpannā), all persons (sabbe puggalā bhāvapariyāpannā), all with a personality (sabbe attabhāvapariyāpannā)
 seven ways of "specified pervasion" - all women (sabbā itthiyo), all men (sabbe purisā), all Noble Ones (sabbe ariyā), all non-Noble Ones (sabbe anariyā), all deities (sabbe devā), all humans (sabbe manussā), all born in lower realms (sabbe vinipātikā),
 ten ways of "directional pervasion", of the eastern direction (puratthimāya disāya), of the western direction (pacchimāya disāya), of the northern direction (uttarā disāya), of the southern direction ( disāya), of the eastern intermediate direction (puratthimāya anudisāya), of the western intermediate direction (pacchimāya anudisāya), of the northern intermediate direction (uttarā anudisāya), # of the southern intermediate direction ( anudisāya), of the downward direction, of the upward direction (uparimāya disāya).

Moreover, the directional pervasions can then be applied to each of the unspecific and specific pervasions. For instance, after radiating benevolence to all beings in the east (Sabbe puratthimāya disāya sattā ...), one radiates it to all beings in the west and then north and then south, etc.; then, one radiates it to all breathing things in this fashion (Sabbe puratthimāya disāya  ...), then all creatures, persons, and so forth until such is extended for all those born in the lower realms.

Benefits
The Pali Canon says that there are a number of benefits from the practicing of metta meditation, including:
One sleeps easily, wakes easily, dreams no evil dreams. One is dear to human beings, dear to non-human beings. The devas protect one. Neither fire, poison, nor weapons can touch one. One's mind gains concentration quickly. One's complexion is bright. One dies unconfused and – if penetrating no higher – is headed for [reborn in] the Brahma worlds.

The Canon also upholds fully ripened metta development as a foremost antidote to ill will:
“No other thing do I know, O monks, on account of which unarisen ill will does not arise and arisen ill will is abandoned so much as on account of this: the liberation of the heart by benevolence.  For one who attends properly to the liberation of the heart by benevolence, unarisen ill will does not arise and arisen ill will is abandoned.”

Monks, whatever grounds there are for making merit productive of a future birth, all these do not equal a sixteenth part of the liberation of mind by benevolence. The liberation of mind by benevolence surpasses them and shines forth, bright and brilliant.

Mettā meditation is regularly recommended to the Buddha's followers in the Pali canon. The canon generally advises radiating metta in each of the six directions, to whatever beings there may be. A different set of practical instructions, still widely used today, is found in the 5th CE Visuddhimagga; this is also the main source for the 'near and far enemies' given above.  In addition, variations on this traditional practice have been popularized by modern teachers and applied in modern research settings.

Maitrī and Mettā 
Metta is found in pre-Buddhist Vedic Sanskrit texts as Maitrī, Maitra and Mitra, which are derived from the ancient root Mid (love), and these Vedic words appear in the Samhita, Aranyaka, Brahmana and Upanishad layers of texts in the Rigveda, Samaveda, Yajurveda and Atharvaveda.

Similarly, the term appears in hymn 55 of Book 19 of the Atharvaveda, and various Upanishads. A major early Upanishad of Hinduism, named Maitri Upanishad, discusses universal kindness and amity. The Maitri Upanishad, states Martin Wiltshire, provides the philosophical underpinning, by asserting, "what one thinks, that one becomes, this is the eternal mystery". This idea, adds Wiltshire, reflects the assumption in the ancient thought that one influences their own environment and situation, causality is equitable, and "good volitional acts conduce pleasant situations, while bad volitional acts conduce unpleasant situations". The Maitri Upanishad teaches, states Juan Mascaró, that peace begins in one's own mind, in one's longing for truth, in looking within, and that "a quietness of mind overcomes good and evil works, and in quietness the soul is one: then one feels the joy of eternity."

The Isha Upanishad similarly discusses universal amity and loving-kindness, but without the term metta. These teachings of universal Maitri influenced Mahatma Gandhi.

In Jainism, Yogabindu – the 6th-century yoga text by Haribhadra – uses the Sanskrit word Maitri in verses 402-404, in the sense of loving-kindness towards all living beings.

Metta meditation research
Some pilot research studies on the effect of Mettā meditation indicate an increase in positive emotions for practitioners. In particular, an immediate impact on positive emotions after practice as well as a long-term effect could be shown, though these effects might not hold true for everybody. In one proof-of-concept study, uncontrolled in sample selection and benchmarking, the researchers report therapeutic potential for psychological problems like depression or social anxiety, when combined with other reliable treatments.

Therapeutic potential 
The application of Mettā meditation for the treatment of psychological and other healthcare-related problems is the topic of current research. Hofmann et al. discuss in their paper the potential use for therapy and report insufficient data, with some promising studies so far. Those studies could show a positive impact on problems such as schizophrenia, depression and anxiety. According to Hofmann et al., there needs to be more rigorous research, especially with the application of Buddhist approaches to loving-kindness and compassion meditation.

In an 8-week pilot study in 2005, loving-kindness meditation showed reduced pain and anger in people with chronic lower back pain. Compassion meditation, a Science Daily article states, may benefit by reductions in inflammatory and behavioral responses to stress that have been linked to depression and a number of medical illnesses.

Mettā meditation is a central practice within mindfulness-based pain management (MBPM), the effectiveness of which has been supported by a range of studies.

Caution and reviews 

Bishop in a 2002 review suggests caution on claims of benefits, and states, "what has been published has been rife with methodological problems. At present, we know very little about the effectiveness of this [mindfulness-lovingkindness-compassion meditation] approach; however, there is some evidence that suggests that it may hold some promise."

In a 2014 review of multiple studies, Galante et al. reach a similar conclusion, stating "results were inconclusive for some outcomes, in particular against active controls; the methodological quality of the reports was low to moderate; results suffered from imprecision due to wide CIs (confidence intervals) deriving from small studies" and that "the kindness meditation methods show evidence of individual and community benefits through its effects on their well-being and social interaction".

See also

 Anapanasati Sutta
 Bhāvanā (contemplation)
 Brahmavihara (Karuṇā, Mudita)
 Kammaṭṭhāna 
 Kayagatasati Sutta 
 Pāramī (perfection)
 Pañña (wisdom)
 Sacca (truth)
 Dāna (generosity)
 Śīla (morality)
 Nekkhamma (renunciation)
 Upekkhā (equanimity)
 Khanti (patience)
 Adhiṭṭhāna (resolute determination)
 Vīrya (diligence)
 Satipatthana Sutta, also called the Four Satipatthanas  
  Similar concepts in other cultures:
Caritas - Latin term for love 
Chesed – a similar Hebrew term, given the association of kindness and love
Philia, Philautia, Storge, Eros, Agape - Greek terms for love

Notes

Sources

 Acharya Buddharakkhita (trans.) (1987/2006). "Kakacupama Sutta: The Parable of the Saw (excerpt)" from Positive Response: How to Meet Evil With Good (Bodhi Leaves No. 109). Kandy, Sri Lanka: Buddhist Publication Society (1987). Retrieved from "Access to Insight" (2006) at Kakacupama Sutta: The Parable of the Saw.
 Amaravati Sangha (trans.) (1994, 2004). "Karaniya Metta Sutta: The Buddha's Words on Loving-Kindness" from Chanting Book: Morning and Evening Puja and Reflections (1994). Hemel Hempstead: Amaravati Publications. Retrieved 2007-11-25 from "Access to Insight" (2004) at Karaniya Metta Sutta: The Buddha's Words on Loving-Kindness.
 Bodhi, Bhikkhu (2005). In the Buddha's Words: An Anthology of Discourses from the Pali Canon. Somerville, MA: Wisdom Publications. .
 Buddhaghosa, Bhadantacariya & Bhikkhu  (trans.) (1999). The Path of Purification: Visuddhimagga. Seattle, WA: BPS Pariyatti Editions. .
 Gethin, Rupert (1998). The Foundations of Buddhism. Oxford: Oxford University Press. .
 Gombrich, Richard (1988; reprinted 2002). Theravada Buddhism: A Social History from Ancient Benares to Modern Colombo. Routledge: London. .
 Harvey, Peter (2007). An Introduction to Buddhism: Teachings, History and Practices. Cambridge: Cambridge University Press. .
 Monier-Williams, Monier (1899, 1964). A Sanskrit-English Dictionary. London: Oxford University Press.  .  Retrieved 2008-04-29 from "Cologne University" at MW Scan.
 Ñanamoli Thera (ed., trans.) (1987/1994). The Practice of Loving-Kindness (Metta): As Taught by the Buddha in the Pali Canon (The Wheel No. 7). Kandy, Sri Lanka: Buddhist Publication Society (1987).  Retrieved 2007-11-25 from "Access to Insight" (1994 transcription) at The Practice of Loving-Kindness (Metta): As Taught by the Buddha in the Pali Canon.
 , Bhikkhu (trans.) & Bhikkhu Bodhi (ed.) (2001). The Middle-Length Discourses of the Buddha: A Translation of the Majjhima Nikāya. Boston: Wisdom Publications. .
 Ñanamoli Thera (trans.) & Bhikkhu Khantipalo (ed.) (1993/1994). Saleyyaka Sutta: The Brahmans of Sala (MN 41). Retrieved 2007-12-23 from "Access to Insight" (1994 transcription) at Saleyyaka Sutta: The Brahmans of Sala.
 Nyanaponika Thera (trans.) (1988/1998). "Vatthupama Sutta: The Simile of the Cloth" (MN 7) from The Simile of the Cloth & the Discourse on Effacement (Wheel No. 61). Kandy, Sri Lanka: Buddhist Publication Society (1988).  Retrieved 2007-12-03 from "Access to Insight" (1998) at Vatthupama Sutta: The Simile of the Cloth.
 Nyanaponika Thera & Bhikkhu Bodhi (trans.) (1999). Numerical Discourses of the Buddha: An anthology of Suttas from the  Nikāya.  Walnut Creek, CA: AltaMira Press. .
 Rhys Davids, Caroline A. F. ([1900], 2003). Kessinger Publishing. .
 Rhys Davids, T.W. & William Stede (eds.) (1921-5). The Pali Text Society's Pali–English Dictionary. Chipstead: Pali Text Society. Retrieved 2008-04-29 from "U. Chicago" at http://dsal.uchicago.edu/dictionaries/pali/.
 Salzberg, Sharon (1995). Lovingkindness: The Revolutionary Art of Happiness. Boston: Shambhala Publications. .
 Thanissaro Bhikkhu (trans.) (1994). Raja Sutta: The King (Ud. 5.1). Retrieved 2007-11-25 from "Access to Insight" at Rājan Sutta: The King.
 Thanissaro Bhikkhu (trans.) (1997a). Cunda Kammaraputta Sutta: To Cunda the Silversmith (AN 10.176). Retrieved 2007-11-25 from "Access to Insight" at Cunda Kammaraputta Sutta: To Cunda the Silversmith.
 Thanissaro Bhikkhu (trans.) (1997b). Metta (Mettanisamsa) Sutta: Good Will (AN 11.16). Retrieved 2010-07-07 from "Access to Insight" at Metta (Mettanisamsa) Sutta: Good Will.
 Trungpa, Chögyam (1993). Training the Mind & Cultivating Loving-Kindness.  Boston: Shambhala. .
 Upatissa, Arahant, N.R.M. Ehara (trans.), Soma Thera (trans.) and Kheminda Thera (trans.) (1995). The Path of Freedom (Vimuttimagga). Kandy, Sri Lanka: Buddhist Publication Society. .
 Walshe, Maurice (1995). The Long Discourses of the Buddha: A Translation of the Dīgha Nikāya. Somerville, MA: Wisdom Publications. .
 Warder, A. K. (1970; reprinted 2004). Indian Buddhism. Motilal Banarsidass: Delhi. .

External links
 Brahmavihara Dhamma by Mahasi Sayadaw
 An essay on metta by Acharya Buddharakkhita
 The Four Sublime States and the Practice of Loving Kindness by Ñāṇamoli Bhikkhu & Nyanaponika Thera
 Abundant, Exalted, Immeasurable by Ajahn Pasanno
 I’m Right, You’re Wrong by Ajahn Amaro
 The Metta Sutta
 Dharma Dictionary - RangjungYesheWiki - Byams Pa / Maitri
 Facets of Metta by Sharon Salzberg
 Curbing Anger, Spreading Love by Visuddhacara
 Matthieu Ricard talks about his lifelong practice of Compassion Meditation

Buddhist meditation
Hindu philosophical concepts
Buddhist philosophical concepts
Jain philosophical concepts
Friendship